Maria Giovanna Paone (born on 28 February 1967) is an Italian fashion executive. She is the president and the creative director of the womenswear division at Kiton, a luxury fashion company founded by her father, Ciro Paone, in 1968.

Personal life 
Paone studied in Brighton, England before joining Kitone. 

She is married Michele Klain, a doctor from Naples. They have two children.

Work 
Paone, now a president, joined the company in 1986.  She is a proponent of slow fashion and describes her role as the vice president and creative director of the Women’s Division.

In 1995, Paone introduced a line of womenswear at Kiton. Paone and her team have been working on new accessories for the women’s collection.

In 2021 she received the Italian Forbes CEO Award in the Fashion category.

References

1967 births
21st-century Italian businesswomen
21st-century Italian businesspeople
Businesspeople from Naples
20th-century Italian businesswomen
20th-century Italian businesspeople
Living people